Brian Henry Warner (1919 – 24 January 1968) was a New Zealand cricketer. He played one first-class match for Auckland in 1944/45.

See also
 List of Auckland representative cricketers

References

External links
 

1919 births
1968 deaths
New Zealand cricketers
Auckland cricketers
Cricketers from Auckland